Anaxidia is a genus of Limacodid moths found in Australia, including Western Australia.

Selected species
Anaxidia lactea Swinhoe, 1892
Anaxidia lozogramma (Turner, 1902)

External links
Limacodidae list
Anaxidia lactea at CSIRO Entomology

Limacodidae genera
Limacodidae